Jacob Sanford (1840 – September 3, 1901) was an American soldier who fought for the Union Army during the American Civil War. He received the Medal of Honor for valor.

Biography
Sanford received the Medal of Honor in September 2, 1893 for his actions at the Battle of Spotsylvania Court House, Virginia on May 22, 1863 while with Company F of the 55th Illinois Volunteer Infantry Regiment.

Medal of Honor citation

Citation:

The President of the United States of America, in the name of Congress, takes pleasure in presenting the Medal of Honor to Private Jacob Sanford, United States Army, for gallantry in the charge of the volunteer storming party on 22 May 1863, while serving with 55th Illinois Infantry, in action at Vicksburg, Mississippi.

See also

List of American Civil War Medal of Honor recipients: Q–S

References

External links

1840 births
1901 deaths
Union Army soldiers
United States Army Medal of Honor recipients
American Civil War recipients of the Medal of Honor
Military personnel from Illinois